The 1942 Yale Bulldogs football team represented Yale University in the 1942 college football season.  The Bulldogs were led by first-year head coach Howard Odell, played their home games at the Yale Bowl and finished the season with a 5–3 record.

Schedule

References

Yale
Yale Bulldogs football seasons
[[Category:1942 in sports in Connecticut|Yale Bulldogs football]